Henry Pagden Tamplin (1801–1867) was an English business owner, who together with his father founded Tamplin and Son's Brewery, based at the Phoenix Brewery, Brighton, Sussex.  He was born at Brighton on 8 February 1801, the son of Richard Tamplin and his wife Elizabeth née Pagden; he died at Pyecombe, Sussex on 16 December 1867.

Cricket career
Tamplin was also a cricketer and made two first-class appearances for Sussex against Kent, one in 1827 and another in 1828.  Tamplin's batting style is unknown.  In the 1827 match at the Vine Cricket Ground, Tamplin was run out for 3 runs in Sussex's first-innings, while in their second-innings he was wasn't required to bat, with Sussex winning the match by 4 wickets.  In the 1828 match at the Royal New Ground, Brighton, he was dismissed for 6 runs in Sussex's first-innings by Timothy Duke, while in their second-innings he ended Sussex's innings unbeaten on 1.  The match ended in a draw.

Tamplin's brother-in-law George King, Sr. and nephew George King, Jr. both played first-class cricket.

References

External links
Henry Tamplin at ESPNcricinfo
Henry Tamplin at CricketArchive

1801 births
1867 deaths
People from Brighton
English cricketers
Sussex cricketers